Greenleaf is an American drama television series created by Craig Wright, and executive produced by Oprah Winfrey and Lionsgate Television. Clement Virgo also serves as an executive producer and director. It stars Keith David, Lynn Whitfield, and Merle Dandridge. Greenleaf premiered on the Oprah Winfrey Network (OWN) on June 21, 2016.

On November 23, 2018, OWN renewed the series for a fourth season. The fourth season premiered on September 3, 2019. On November 15, 2019, OWN confirmed the renewal of a fifth and final season of the series, which premiered on June 23, 2020. A spinoff of Greenleaf is in works on OWN, and will focus on Whitfield's character and her new role as senior pastor.

Premise
Greenleaf follows the unscrupulous world of the Greenleaf family with scandalous secrets and lies, their palatial family mansion compound, and their sprawling Memphis megachurch with predominantly African-American members. The series' lead characters are Bishop James Greenleaf (David) and Lady Mae Greenleaf (Whitfield), who are the patriarch and matriarch of the Greenleaf family, and Grace Greenleaf (Dandridge), their estranged daughter who has returned home after 20 years following the mysterious death of her sister, Faith. Deep down, this family cares for and loves each other, but secrets, lies, adultery, sibling rivalry and other issues swarm the family as they try to keep themselves together. There are a variety of people who try to run the family out of their beloved church but they lay it all on the line to keep each other tight and close like any family.

Production

Development 
On July 30, 2015, OWN announced that it had ordered Greenleaf—a new drama following an African-American megachurch run by the eponymous family in Memphis, Tennessee. Both Greenleaf and another series announced that year, Queen Sugar, were the first scripted series acquired by OWN that were not produced by Tyler Perry. The series was created by Lost and Six Feet Under writer Craig Wright and executive produced by Oprah Winfrey with Wright and Lionsgate Television, with 13 episodes for the first season set for production later in 2015. On September 9, 2015, The Book of Negroes writer and director Clement Virgo joined the series as executive producer and director of the pilot episode.

Filming of the first season began in October, 2015 in Atlanta, and ended on March 24, 2016. On January 21, 2016, it was announced that the series would debut with a two-night premiere at 10 p.m. Tuesday, May 24, 2016 and 10 p.m. Wednesday, May 25, and would regularly air on Wednesdays at 10 p.m. Later premiere was moved to June 21, 2016 and June 22, 2016. The world premiere of Greenleaf was during the Tribeca Film Festival in April, before its television debut in June, of 2016.

In 2020, it was announced that Craig Wright is writing a spinoff for series. The series will focus on Lady Mae’s new role as pastor of a church.

Casting
Casting advertising began in August 2015. On August 24, 2015, it was announced that Lynn Whitfield, Merle Dandridge and Desiree Ross are the first actors cast in series. Emmy Award winner Whitfield will star as Lady Mae Greenleaf, Bishop Greenleaf's wife, steely and power and money hungry matriarch of the family, while Dandridge play her estranged daughter who returns to home with her teenage daughter (played by Ross). On September 3, 2015, Keith David was cast in the leading role of Bishop James Greenleaf, the family patriarch and leader of Calvary Fellowship World Ministries. On September 4, 2015 Tye White has been cast as son-in-law of the Bishop. On September 9, 2015, Lamman Rucker, Kim Hawthorne and Deborah Joy Winans have landed the last three regular roles. Rucker plays eldest son, Jacob, while Hawthorne stars as his controlling wife, Kerissa. Winans plays Charity, the youngest daughter of the Bishop.

On September 24, 2015, it was announced that series' executive producer Oprah Winfrey joined Greenleaf in a recurring role as Mavis McCready, the sister of Lady Mae Greenleaf. Whitfield and Winfrey previous co-starred in the 1989 miniseries The Women of Brewster Place. On November 20, 2015 Anna Diop was cast as a teacher who is engaged to Greenleaf Estate's manager. Three days later, it was announced that Terri J. Vaughn will recur as chief housekeeper at Greenleaf mansion.

For the second season, Lovie Simone and GregAlan Williams were promoted to series regulars after appearing as recurring in almost all episodes in first season.

Cast and characters

Main cast
Keith David as Bishop James Greenleaf, the charismatic and strong leader of Calvary Fellowship World Ministries and Greenleaf family patriarch.
Lynn Whitfield as "First Lady" Daisy Mae Greenleaf, née McCready, Bishop Greenleaf's wife, First Lady of Calvary Fellowship and family matriarch.
Merle Dandridge as Pastor Grace "Gigi" Greenleaf, Mae and Bishop's eldest child. She returns home 20 years after escaping from the family. Her mother and siblings consistently deplore her "desertion". She proudly serves as Executive Pastor of Ministry at Calvary Fellowship under Bishop and First Lady Greenleaf Leadership. 
Desiree Ross as Sophia Greenleaf, Grace's teenage daughter, who shares her mother's charms and whose deep religious faith is challenged.
Lamman Rucker as Pastor Jacob Greenleaf, the second-born child and only son of the Bishop. He resents Grace for abandoning the family and leaving him to take her place in the ministry, crushing his dream of a career in professional baseball. He previously and proudly served as Associate Pastor of Discipleship, and now serves as Senior Pastor of Triumph Fellowship Church. 
Kim Hawthorne as Kerissa Greenleaf, Jacob's ambitious and controlling wife and headmistress of Excellence Academy.
Deborah Joy Winans as Charity Greenleaf, the youngest Greenleaf child and also Minister of Music at Calvary Fellowship. Being the youngest, she is furious at being left out of family situations. Like Jacob, she resents Grace for leaving the family, forcing Charity to stay bound to her family's church.
Tye White as Kevin Satterlee, Charity's husband and director of Outreach at Calvary Fellowship (seasons 1–3)
Gregory Alan Williams as Robert "Mac" McCready, Lady Mae's brother. (recurring season 1; main season 2).
Lovie Simone as Zora Greenleaf, Kerissa and Jacob's rebellious teenage daughter. (recurring season 1; main seasons 2–5)
Rick Fox as Darius Nash, a journalist for the Tennessee Statesman. (recurring seasons 2 & 5; main season 3)

Recurring cast

Episodes

Ahead of its television premiere, on April 21, 2016, the series was renewed for a second season, which premiered on March 15, 2017. Season 2 returned with new episodes on a two-night premiere beginning on August 15, 2017. On August 7, 2017, the series was renewed for a third season, which premiered in a two-night premiere on August 28 and August 29, 2018 and ran until November 21, 2018. On September 19, 2018, the series was renewed for a fourth season. On May 3, 2020, OWN announced that a fifth and final season, which premiered on June 23, 2020.

A one-hour special titled Greenleaf: Goin' Up Yonder premiered on June 16, 2020. A post-finale special titled Greenleaf: The Homegoing Celebration premiered on August 11, 2020.

Reception
The first season of Greenleaf received mainly positive reviews from critics, who particularly praised the acting performances of the series' lead actress, Merle Dandridge, as well as Lynn Whitfield and Keith David. On Rotten Tomatoes, the first season of Greenleaf has an approval rating of 79%, based on 18 reviews, with an average rating of 6.9/10. The site's critical consensus reads, "Immersed in a unique megachurch setting, Greenleaf is a juicy family soap bolstered by a provocative spirituality." Metacritic gave season one of the show a score of 68 out of 100, based on 20 critics, indicating "generally favorable reviews."

Maureen Ryan, television critic for Variety stated "Dandridge is naturalistic in her portrayal of a practical, cautious woman re-examining her family history and her own choices and mistakes, while Whitfield has the imperious aura of a grand soap opera diva in the tradition of Joan Collins." Daniel Fienberg from The Hollywood Reporter  wrote in his review "effectively balance the melodrama, vast ensemble and church details and contribute a level of technical proficiency that goes far beyond what the Tyler Perry Factory brings to The Haves and the Have Nots, OWN's big scripted hit." The Boston Globes  Matthew Gilbert compared Greenleaf with primetime soaps like Revenge and the similarly black-cast Empire.

Greenleaf has received positive reviews from critics, with most praising Dandridge, Whitfield and David's performances. The series premiere drew 3.04 million viewers, making it the No. 1 series debut in OWN history. On April 21, 2016, the series was renewed for a second season ahead of its television premiere. The second season premiered on March 15, 2017. On August 7, 2017, the series was renewed for a third season. The third season premiered in a two-episode special on August 28 and August 29, 2018. On September 19, 2018, the series was renewed for a fourth season.

Accolades

International broadcast
The series is broadcast by Netflix worldwide outside the United States and Canada.

Soundtrack
The gospel songs recorded by the cast were released on iTunes, as an album entitled Greenleaf (Gospel Companion Soundtrack, Vol. 1).

References

External links

Greenleaf at Oprah Winfrey Network

2010s American black television series
2010s American LGBT-related drama television series
2010s American mystery television series
2016 American television series debuts
2020 American television series endings
2020s American black television series
2020s American LGBT-related drama television series
2020s American mystery television series
American television soap operas
English-language television shows
Infidelity in television
Oprah Winfrey Network original programming
Rape in television
Serial drama television series
Television series about dysfunctional families
Television series by Harpo Productions
Television series by Lionsgate Television
Television shows filmed in Georgia (U.S. state)
Television shows set in Tennessee